Ernest F. Storandt was a member of the Wisconsin State Assembly.

Biography
Storandt was born on July 2, 1882 in Burr Oak, Wisconsin. There, he opened a general store. He later operated a department store and a bakery. He died on September 1, 1968.

Political career
Storandt was elected to the Assembly in 1944. Additionally, he was Postmaster of Burr Oak. He was a Republican.

References

People from Farmington, La Crosse County, Wisconsin
Businesspeople from Wisconsin
Republican Party members of the Wisconsin State Assembly
Wisconsin postmasters
1882 births
1968 deaths
20th-century American politicians
20th-century American businesspeople